The 2022 Tennessee State Tigers football team represented Tennessee State University as a member of the Ohio Valley Conference (OVC) during the 2022 NCAA Division I FCS football season. They are led by second-year head coach Eddie George and play their games at Nissan Stadium in Nashville, Tennessee.

Previous season

The Tigers finished the 2021 season with a 5–6 record, 3–3 in OVC play to finish tied for fourth place in the conference.

Schedule

Source:

Game summaries

at No. 13 Eastern Washington

vs. No. 13 Jackson State

at Middle Tennessee

Lane

Bethune–Cookman

at Tennessee Tech

Eastern Illinois

at Murray State

No. 22 Southeast Missouri State

UT Martin

at Texas A&M–Commerce

References

Tennessee State
Tennessee State Tigers football seasons
Tennessee State Tigers football